Anolis ahli, also known commonly as Ahl's anole and the Escambray blue-eyed anole, is a species of lizard in the family Dactyloidae. The species is endemic to Cuba.

Etymology
The specific name, ahli, is in honor of German zoologist Ernst Ahl.

Habitat
The preferred natural habitat of A. ahli is forest.

Description
The iris of the eye is blue.

Diet
A. ahli preys upon fruit flies, roaches, and isopods.

Reproduction
A. ahli is oviparous.

References

Further reading
Barbour T (1925). "A new Cuban Anolis ". Occasional Papers of the Boston Society of Natural History 5: 167–168. (Anolis ahli, new species).
Schwartz A, Henderson RW (1991). Amphibians and Reptiles of the West Indies: Descriptions, Distributions, and Natural History. Gainesville: University of Florida Press. 720 pp. . (Anolis ahli, p. 209).
Schwartz A, Thomas R (1975). A Check-list of West Indian Amphibians and Reptiles. Carnegie Museum of Natural History Special Publication No. 1. Pittsburgh, Pennsylvania: Carnegie Museum of Natural History. 216 pp. (Anolis ahli, p. 65).

Anoles
Reptiles of Cuba
Endemic fauna of Cuba
Reptiles described in 1925
Taxa named by Thomas Barbour